Vicky Krieps (born 4 October 1983) is a Luxembourgish-German actress. She has appeared in a number of American, Luxembourgish, French and German productions. Krieps' breakthrough role was in Paul Thomas Anderson's Academy Award-winning film Phantom Thread (2017).

Krieps early films include Hanna (2011), Two Lives (2012), and A Most Wanted Man (2013). She also appeared in The Girl in the Spider's Web (2018), The Last Vermeer (2019), and Old (2021). She gained critical attention for her performances in Bergman Island (2021), and Hold Me Tight (2021). She received a Cannes Film Festival Award and European Film Award for her performance in  Corsage (2022).

Early life 
Krieps was born in Luxembourg City, the daughter of a Luxembourgish father, who managed a film distribution company, and of a German mother. Her father, Bob Krieps, is the director general of the Ministry of Culture of Luxembourg, the former director of Sacem Luxembourg, and the former president of the Luxembourg Film Fund. Several of her films have been funded by the Luxembourg Film Fund, which is supervised by the Ministry of Culture, which then decides which films will be funded by state subsidies. Her paternal grandfather, Robert Krieps, was a politician, war-time member of the Luxembourg Resistance, and Luxembourg's Minister of Justice, National Education and Culture in the 1970s and 1980s.

Krieps had her first acting experiences at the Lycée de Garçons secondary school in Luxembourg, receiving training at the Conservatoire of Luxembourg City. In 2004, she was far from convinced that her career would be her future. Rather than enrolling in one of the drama schools, she participated in a social project at the primary school of a South African township near Knysna. This confirmed her resolve to study acting, with the goal of performing on theatre stages. She attended Zurich University of the Arts, while gathering acting experience at Schauspielhaus Zürich.

Career 
She starred opposite Daniel Day-Lewis in the period film Phantom Thread. Receiving critical acclaim for her role, Dan Jolin of Empire stated that Krieps "can hold her own opposite a titan like Day-Lewis," while David Edelstein of Vulture wrote that she is "bewitchingly lucent, her face just masklike enough to make our sudden awareness of all her dark thoughts a shock." Krieps played the magazine publisher in The Girl in the Spider's Web. She played the morally compromised Alsatian interpreter in the television series Das Boot and subsequently in the second series. In 2021, Krieps starred in M. Night Shyamalan's thriller mystery film Old, and in the drama film Bergman Island.

Personal life 
Krieps moved to Berlin, Germany in her early 20s. She resides in Berlin with her two children, daughter Elisa (born 2011) and son Jan-Noah (born 2015), and her partner, the German actor .

When asked about the #MeToo movement, Krieps said: "Maybe it's very European, but I always see both sides. I feel very sorry for the people who have been harassed, but I also feel very sorry for the people who have lived a life where they have been harassing people. You cannot tell me any of these people are really happy, it's more like a disease. So I really think it's important for everyone to wake up. That would be my hashtag: #WakeUp."

In April 2021, Krieps was part of the controversial campaign #allesdichtmachen ("close everything down"), which featured 50 German-speaking actors making fun of Germany's protective measures against COVID-19. In her video, Krieps says, among other things, that acting helped her to deal with her fear of people. "During this time, we all learned how good it is to finally get away from it all. To alienate, not always having to let others get close to you. Above all, you don't know if the people you meet are washed." The campaign, released when Germany had more than 80,000 deaths related to COVID, was highly criticized as being "tasteless" and "cringe-worthy", but it also received support from members of the far-right and COVID-deniers, who were rejoicing to find material supporting their own criticism of the authorities' handling of the pandemic.

When Krieps was questioned on Instagram about the alleged abuser in the cast of her film Corsage that was kept in the film after director Marie Kreutzer was informed about him, she said: "So, a feminist film made by two women should be discarded because of the misconduct of a male colleague? (Second question) Who exactly is being harmed by this?". Krieps was also an executive producer on Corsage. The case became public in Austria in June 2022, when Austrian director Katharina Mückstein shared an Instagram story that generated a lot of media attention and sparked a new wave of the #MeToo Movement in Austria.

Filmography

Film

Television

Awards and nominations

References

External links 
 
 

1983 births
Living people
Luxembourgian film actresses
German film actresses
Luxembourgian people of German descent
21st-century Luxembourgian actresses
21st-century German actresses
People from Luxembourg City
Actresses from Berlin
Luxembourgian expatriates in Germany